Pakal (603–683) was ajaw of the Maya city-state of Palenque in the Late Classic period of pre-Columbian Mesoamerican chronology.

Pakal may also refer to:

Items relating to the Mayans
Pakal (also spelled Pacal; meaning "shield" in several Maya languages) forms the (common) name or part of the full name of several pre-Columbian Maya personages identified in the monumental inscriptions of sites in the Maya region of Mesoamerica. As such this may also refer to:

At Palenque:
 Janahb Pakal (died 612),  Janaab' Pakal; Pakal "the Elder", nobleman of Palenque
 K'inich Janaab Pakal II (fl. c. 742), a.k.a. Upakal K'inich; U Pakal K'inich, 15th ruler
 Janaab Pakal III (fl. c. 799), a.k.a. 6 Kimi Pakal, Janaab' Pakal III; 18th and last known named ruler.

At Chichen Itza:
 K'ak'upakal (fl. 9th century), a.k.a. K'ak' Upakal; mid to late 9th century ruler at Chichen Itza

At Yaxchilan:
 Lady Pacal (died 705) of Yaxchilan

Places in Iran
 Pakal, Fars
 Pakal, Markazi

Other uses
 Pakal (film), a 2006 film
 Pakal Dul Dam, proposed in India
 Pakal Nakshatrangal, a 2008 Malayalam film written & directed by Rajeev Nath